Jenny Zhang (born 1983) is an American writer, poet, and prolific essayist based in Brooklyn, New York. One focus of her work is on the Chinese American immigrant identity and experience in the United States. She has published a collection of poetry called Dear Jenny, We Are All Find and a non-fiction chapbook called Hags. From 2011 to 2014, Zhang wrote extensively for Rookie. Additionally, Zhang has worked as a freelance essayist for other publications. In August 2017, Zhang's short story collection, Sour Heart, was the first acquisition by Lena Dunham's Lenny imprint, Lenny Books, via Random House.

Early life
Zhang was born in Shanghai, China. When she was five years old, Zhang immigrated to New York City to join her father, who was studying linguistics at New York University, and mother, who had come to the United States after the Chinese Cultural Revolution. Her father withdrew from the PhD program he was enrolled in, began to work as a teacher, and re-enrolled in school for computer programming, with the family eventually moving to Long Island where her father ran a computer repair business. She has a younger brother.

In 2005, Zhang graduated from Stanford University with a BA in Comparative Studies in Race & Ethnicity. In 2009, Zhang received a Master of Fine Arts in fiction from the Iowa Writers' Workshop.

Career 
After college, Zhang moved to San Francisco where she worked as a union organizer for Chinese home healthcare workers and as an organizer for the writing non-profit 826 Valencia which helps children and young adults learn how to write. Zhang spent a summer in Hungary teaching English as a second language.

While in graduate school at the Iowa Writers' Workshop, Zhang taught creative writing to undergraduates at University of Iowa. Zhang then taught high school students in the Bronx, Queens, and Brooklyn. She has also taught at the New School For Social Research and at Sackett Street Writers' Workshop.

From 2011 to 2014, Zhang was a regular contributor to the online magazine for teen girls, Rookie, for which she has written both fiction and nonfiction since the magazine's inception.

Among the essays Zhang wrote for Rookie were a 2012 tribute to the rapper M.I.A., The Importance of Angsty Art, an essay on embracing "bad" writing, Odd Girl In, an essay about the conflict between the impulse to rebel and the desire to join political movements, partly based on Zhang's experiences with organizing and activism in San Francisco, Empathy Excess, an essay about emotional abuse and the limits of empathy, and Far Away From Me, an essay about the search for decolonized love, a conflicted teenage love for Weezer, and a deconstruction and investigation into fetishization, objectification, and internalized racism.

In 2012, Zhang published a collection of poetry called Dear Jenny, We Are All Find. Zhang had written some of the poems that made up the collection during her time at Iowa Writers' Workshop, which she did in secret as the poetry program was separate from her fiction program. She wrote the rest of the poems while living in the south of France. The poems were submitted to a contest for a small press, Octopus Books.

In 2014, Lena Dunham asked her to join a promotional tour for her book, Not That Kind of Girl. This later led to Dunham publishing Zhang's 2017 book, Sour Heart.

2015's "Hags" is an essay Zhang wrote in one night after watching Senator Wendy Davis do a 13-hour filibuster of SB5, a Texas Senate bill that sought to limit access to abortion services. It was then published by Guillotine Books as a limited edition chapbook.

In July 2015, Zhang published an essay called "How It Feels" for an issue of Poetry magazine that was curated by Tavi Gevinson. The essay was a meditation on depression, suicide, excess, Tracey Emin, and poetry. It was nominated for a National Magazine Award.

In August 2015, one of Zhang's stories was included in the first issue of Lena Dunham's Lenny newsletter.

In September 2015, Zhang wrote about issues of racism in the literary community for BuzzFeed.

In August 2017, Zhang's short story collection, Sour Heart, was published by Lena Dunham's Lenny Books imprint on Random House. Many of the stories were written and evolved over a long period of time, with the oldest having initially been written when Zhang was 19 years old, the short story called "The Evolution of My Brother." Zhang said that the title and theme of the book came from a wish "to convey the unreality of childhood, the sweetness and the sourness of being so small, so helpless, and so dependent on adults. We tend to render childhood as purely idyllic and innocent, or totally nightmarish and traumatic, but there's a spectrum of nuance that lies between." Sour Heart, a group of seven bildungsroman stories, received positive reviews.

In May 2019, it was announced that Sour Heart would be made into a movie, to be directed by Cathy Yan.

Selected works and publications 
In chronological order by section

Poetry 

 
 
 
 
 
 
 
 
 
 Zhang, Jenny. "uncle boo." Adult
 Zhang, Jenny. "My baby first birthday." Adult

Non-fiction

Fiction, poetry, and essay collections 
 
  
 
 
 
  – also known as Pity Our Errors, Pity Our Sins

Other works 
Video
 "The Last Five Centuries Were Uneventful"
 "Comefarts"

Photography

Honors 
 2009-2010: Iowa Writers' Workshop, Provost Fellowship
 2009-2010: Iowa Writers' Workshop, Teaching-Writing Fellowship
 2010: Zoetrope All-Story Short Fiction Contest, 2nd prize
 2012-2013: Lower Manhattan Cultural Council, Workspace writer-in-residence
 2016: National Magazine Awards, Essays and Criticism finalist for How It Feels
 2016: APRIL Festival, Writer-in-Residence
 2018: Los Angeles Times Book Prize, Art Seidenbaum Award for First Fiction
 2018: PEN/Robert W. Bingham Prize for Sour Heart

References

External links

 
 Jenny Zhang at Rookie

Living people
American women poets
Writers from Shanghai
Chinese emigrants to the United States
21st-century American poets
21st-century American women writers
Stanford University alumni
Iowa Writers' Workshop alumni
Writers from Brooklyn
Poets from New York (state)
1983 births